Demina is a rural locality (a village) in Stepanovskoye Rural Settlement, Kudymkarsky District, Perm Krai, Russia. The population was 107 as of 2010. There are 8 streets.

Geography 
Demina is located 4 km northwest of Kudymkar (the district's administrative centre) by road. Kudymkar is the nearest rural locality.

References 

Rural localities in Kudymkarsky District